Ostrinia kasmirica is a moth in the family Crambidae. It was described by Frederic Moore in 1888. It is found in Kashmir and Russia.

Subspecies
Ostrinia kasmirica kasmirica (Kashmir)
Ostrinia kasmirica eurasiatica Mutuura & Munroe, 1970 (Russia)

References

Moths described in 1888
Pyraustinae